The 1908 Italian Athletics Championships  were held in Rome. it was the 3rd edition of the Italian Athletics Championships.

Champions

References

External links 
 Italian Athletics Federation

Italian Athletics Championships
Italian Athletics Outdoor Championships
1908 in Italian sport